Agustín Edwards Ross (February 17, 1852, Valparaíso – November 1, 1897) was a Chilean businessman and politician.  Edwards served as the President of the Senate of Chile from 1893 through 1895. He was the son of Agustín Edwards Ossandón and Juana Ross Edwards.

See also
Edwards family

1852 births
1897 deaths
People from Valparaíso
Edwards family
Chilean people of English descent
Chilean people of Scottish descent
National Party (Chile, 1857) politicians
Liberal Party (Chile, 1849) politicians
Deputies of the XVIII Legislative Period of the National Congress of Chile
Deputies of the XIX Legislative Period of the National Congress of Chile
Deputies of the XX Legislative Period of the National Congress of Chile
Deputies of the XXI Legislative Period of the National Congress of Chile
Senators of the XXII Legislative Period of the National Congress of Chile
Senators of the XXIII Legislative Period of the National Congress of Chile
Senators of the XXIV Legislative Period of the National Congress of Chile
Senators of the XXV Legislative Period of the National Congress of Chile
Chilean businesspeople
People of the Chilean Civil War of 1891 (Congresistas)